The fish collar, a cut from a fish's clavicle, is a seafood delicacy.

Summary 
Fish collars are popular in Asian countries and are mostly found in Asian fish markets. Collars come in chunks of fins, skin, and bones and are difficult to clean.

References 

Fish anatomy
Seafood